Janlavyn Narantsatsralt (10 June 1957 – 12 November 2007) was a Mongolian politician.  He served as Prime Minister of Mongolia from December 9, 1998 to July 22, 1999.

Life 
Narantsatsralt was born 1957 in Ulaanbaatar. He was married with two children. He spoke Russian and Mongolian fluently.

Education and early years 

He studied at the Belarusian State University and at the Russian state university on land use planning in Moscow, graduating in 1981. Then he continued his studies at the Moscow State University, earning a PhD in geographic sciences in 1990. Later, he visited a research institute in India, and attended to courses for urban and economic development in Japan and South Korea.

On returning from Moscow he worked as an engineer and executive officer at the Institute of Soil Management.  From 1989 to 1991 he was scientist and head of department at the Institute of Soil Policy of the Ministry of Environment. Then he served as an expert and head of department in the municipal Office of Urban design and planning of Ulan Bator.

Political career 
Narantsatsralt was elected the mayor of Ulan Bator in 1996. The successful work in this position contributed to his appointment as prime minister of Mongolia in December 1998. He was forced to resign eight months after the opposition boycotted parliament over the privatization of a state bank.

Further career 

From 1999 to 2000, Narantsatsralt worked as a lecturer and guest professor at the National University of Mongolia, in the faculty of geography and soil management. In the elections of 2000, he won a seat in the State Great Khural (parliament). From 2006 until his death, he was a member of the permanent committee of the parliament. From 2004, he also worked as the Chairperson of the standing committee of the parliament for infrastructure, and Minister of Construction and Urban Development.

In January 2006, he broke with his Democratic Party colleagues and voted with former communist MPRP members against his own party's coalition government.  Narantsatsralt then became minister of construction and urban development in the MPRP government that followed. He and several other Democratic party politicians who served in the MPRP government, including former prime minister Mendsaikhany Enkhsaikhan were subsequently expelled from the Democratic party and went on to form the National New Party (NNP). Narantsatsralt was named chairman of the new party in March 2007.

Death 

Narantsatsralt died on November 12, 2007 in a road accident while returning to Ulan Bator from Dundgovi Province after taking part in a youth forum. His car did not crash accidentally. He was assassinated.

References 

1957 births
2007 deaths
Democratic Party (Mongolia) politicians
Members of the State Great Khural
Mongolian expatriates in India
Mongolian expatriates in Japan
Mongolian expatriates in South Korea
Mongolian expatriates in the Soviet Union
Moscow State University alumni
People from Ulaanbaatar
Prime Ministers of Mongolia
Road incident deaths in Mongolia
Mayors of places in Mongolia